Pablo Cruise is an American pop/rock band from San Francisco currently composed of David Jenkins (guitar and vocals), Cory Lerios (keyboards and vocals), Sergio Gonzalez (drums), Larry Antonino (bass and vocals) and Robbie Wyckoff (vocals and percussion). Formed in 1973, the band released eight studio albums over the next decade, during which time five singles reached the top 25 of the Billboard Hot 100 chart. The group underwent several personnel changes and split up in 1986. The original lineup—Jenkins, Lerios, Price and Bud Cockrell—reunited briefly in 2004, and the group continues to tour today with two out of the original four members present.

History
Pablo Cruise began in San Francisco, in 1973, with former members of Stoneground (Cory Lerios on keyboards and vocals, David Jenkins as vocalist and on guitar and Steve Price on drums) and It's a Beautiful Day (Bud Cockrell on bass and vocals). Lerios had formed a band while at Palo Alto High School. His classmate, Steve Price, signed on as a roadie (because he owned a van), then joined the group on drums when their drummer left. They were eventually to find their way into Stoneground, where they were joined by Jenkins (originally from Ypsilanti, Michigan).

Initially, many fans assumed that Pablo Cruise was the name of one of the members of the band. When asked the question, the band, which is a quartet, would answer, "He's the guy in the middle." When asked what Pablo Cruise meant, the band would say that "Pablo represents an honest, real, down- to-earth individual; and Cruise depicts his fun-loving and easygoing attitude towards life."

The band signed to A&M Records and released its first album in August 1975, a minor success self-titled Pablo Cruise, and their second album in April 1976, titled Lifeline. Their second album achieved slightly greater success than their first, but still only managed to chart at No. 139 in the United States. The instrumental "Zero to Sixty in Five" from Lifeline was used as theme music for various sports television shows. That success encouraged the band to try their hand at more film and TV scoring.

1977's A Place in the Sun was the turning point in the band's career, as they finally entered the mainstream music scene with hit singles "Whatcha Gonna Do?" (No. 6) and the title track "A Place in the Sun" (No. 42), the album peaked at No. 19 on the Billboard 200.

Further success and lineup changes
In the middle of 1977, Bud Cockrell left to form a duo with his wife and former It's a Beautiful Day bandmate, Pattie Santos, and was replaced by Bruce Day (who had played in a band with Carlos Santana before his Santana days).

Day's first album with the band was the RIAA platinum-selling 1978 album Worlds Away, which spawned the hits "Love Will Find a Way" and "Don't Want to Live Without It". It also featured a cover of Australian singer-songwriter Peter Allen's hit single "I Go to Rio" and the follow-up album was 1979's Part of the Game that spawned the hit "I Want You Tonight". Also that year, Pablo Cruise contributed the song "Reach For The Top" to the movie Dreamer and the following year, they placed "What've You Got To Lose" with the film Inside Moves.

Day's tenure was short-lived and after he left the band in 1980, he was replaced by the session bassist John Pierce who, alongside newly added second guitarist Angelo Rossi, debuted on the 1981 album Reflector, and it spawned the band's last Top 40 hit "Cool Love".

In mid-1981, Price left suddenly and was initially succeeded by Donny Baldwin, who had played with Elvin Bishop and would move on to Jefferson Starship by the summer of 1982. David Perper was next to take over the drum throne and Angelo Rossi was replaced by Stef Birnbaum (aka Stef Burns) after just one album.

In 1983 the group released Out of Our Hands, which featured a change of sound to a more "'80s pop keyboard direction", with Lerios bringing in more synthesizers and downplaying the piano, which had until then been a characteristic of the group's sound, and Price played drums on two songs. The band then toured again that year with another new member, Jorge Bermudez, on vocals and percussion. Mostly due to the rising popularity of new wave, the album struggled with sales. By the end of 1984, Pierce, Birnbaum and Bermudez had left and the group's contract with A&M had come to end.

1985 attempted reunion and hiatus
In 1985 the four original members, Jenkins, Lerios, Price and Cockrell, reunited hoping to score a new record deal. It was not to be, however, and the group called it quits in 1986.

Jenkins moved on to join country rockers Southern Pacific in 1987, alongside former Doobie Brothers members Keith Knudsen and John McFee and Creedence Clearwater Revival bass player Stu Cook. After leaving Southern Pacific in 1989, Jenkins relocated to Hawaii where he was introduced to Hawaiian artist Kapono Beamer and began writing music with him. This eventually led to their album  Cruisin' On Hawaiian Time (2006), a collection of songs dedicated to the Hawaiian Islands.

In the meantime, Cory Lerios worked on movie and television scores, providing the music for the popular 1990s series Baywatch, among many others.

1996 partial reunion
Around 1996, Jenkins and Cockrell reunited once again as Pablo Cruise, but Lerios and Price were unable to rejoin at the time.  Keyboardist Kincaid Miller and drummer Kevin Wells were brought in to replace them, and percussionist James Henry also appeared with the band as an occasional special guest from 1999 to 2008. Additionally, second guitarist Ken Emerson and two additional backup singers, Caroline and Renita, were also recruited (briefly in 2002) for added stage attraction. Drummer Billy Johnson (ex-Santana) temporarily sat in for Wells in 2002.

Former bassist Bruce Day died on June 30, 1999, in Windsor, California, from unknown causes at the age of 48.

2004 to present
In June 2004 all four original Pablo members were back together playing again at Steve Price's wedding. This led to three of the four—Jenkins, Lerios and Price—deciding to reconvene permanently. Cockrell was not involved this time and George Gabriel joined on bass and vocals. During his time away from Pablo Cruise, Price went on to become a leading figure in providing E-learning and also formed his own aerial photography company. Gabriel left Pablo Cruise in November 2009 and was replaced by veteran bassist Larry Antonino (who has worked with Air Supply, Jeff Beck, Ronnie Laws and many others) in 2010.

Bud Cockrell died on March 6, 2010, after complications from diabetes. He was 59.

On November 8, 2011, Pablo Cruise released their first live album, It's Good to Be Live, on the Red Recording label. The package included both a live CD and DVD. The live performances were taken from concerts performed at the Blue Goose in Loomis, CA on July 9 and 10, 2010. The CD also featured new versions of their songs "A Place in the Sun" (featuring fellow Red Recording artist Katrina) and "Love Will Find a Way" (with Ty Taylor of Vintage Trouble).

In 2015, Cory Lerios released an EP, If I Could Change Anything It Would Be You!, under the name Cory Charles.

In 2017, the band was joined by singer/percussionist Robbie Wyckoff who had appeared with Pink Floyd's Roger Waters on his The Wall Live tour.

In February 2020, the band finished the Rock and Romance Cruise, which turned out to be their final shows for 2020. During the COVID-19 lockdown, the band worked on a new single, "Breathe", via Skype, with new drummer Sergio Gonzalez in place of Steve Price, who had retired from the group due to health issues.

The band resumed playing shows in the summer of 2021 and continues to tour, mainly in and around California.

Band members

Current members
David Jenkins – guitar, vocals (1973–1986, 1996–present)
Cory Lerios – keyboards, synthesizers, vocals (1973–1986, 2004–present)
Larry Antonino – bass, vocals (2010–present)
Sergio Gonzalez – drums, percussion (2020–present)
Robbie Wyckoff – percussion, vocals (2017–present)

Past members
Bud Cockrell – bass, vocals (1973–1977, 1985–1986, 1996–2004; died 2010)
Steve Price – drums, percussion (1973–1981, 2004–2020)
Bruce Day – bass, vocals (1977–1980; died 1999)
John Pierce – bass, vocals (1980–1984)
Angelo Rossi – guitar, vocals (1980–1983)
David Perper – drums, percussion (1982–1984)
Stef Birnbaum – guitar, vocals (1983–1984) (aka Stef Burns)
Jorge Bermudez - vocals, percussion (1983–1984)
Kincaid Miller - keyboards (1996–2004)
Kevin Wells - drums, percussion, backing vocals (1996–2002, 2002–2004)
James Henry - percussion (occasionally 1999–2008)
Billy Johnson - drums, percussion (2002)
Ken Emerson - guitar, vocals (2002)
Renita - backup vocals (2002)
Caroline - backup vocals  (2002)
George Gabriel – bass, vocals (2004–2009)

Discography

Studio albums

Compilation albums

Live albums

Singles

See also
List of best-selling music artists

References

External links
Official website

American pop rock music groups
American soft rock music groups
Musical groups established in 1973
Musical groups disestablished in 1986
Musical groups reestablished in 1996
A&M Records artists
Musical groups from San Francisco
Musical quintets
Musical quartets